ArcaOS is an operating system based on OS/2, developed and marketed by Arca Noae, LLC under license from IBM. It was codenamed Blue Lion during its development. It builds on OS/2 Warp 4.52 by adding support for new hardware, fixing defects and limitations in the operating system, and by including new applications and tools. It is targeted at professional users who need to run their OS/2 applications on new hardware, as well as personal users of OS/2.

Like OS/2 Warp, ArcaOS is a 32-bit single user, multiprocessing, preemptive multitasking operating system for the x86 architecture. It is supported on both physical hardware and virtual machine hypervisors.

Features

Hardware compatibility

ArcaOS supports symmetric multiprocessing systems with up to 64 processor cores, although it is recommended to disable hyperthreading. As of version 5.0.6, ArcaOS is ACPI 6.1-compliant and includes the 20200717 release of ACPICA.

While ArcaOS is a 32-bit operating system, it has limited PAE support which allows it to use RAM in excess of 4GB as a RAM disk.

ArcaOS supports being run as a virtual machine guest inside VirtualBox, VMware ESXi, VMWare Workstation and Microsoft Virtual PC.

In addition to the device drivers included with OS/2 Warp 4, ArcaOS includes a variety of drivers developed by Arca Noae, and various third parties:

 Network adapters are supported either with Arca Noae's MultiMac technology, which employs FreeBSD driver code, or a selection of GenMAC drivers. Support for wireless networking is somewhat limited, though MultiMac support for additional chipsets is planned for future releases of ArcaOS.
 ArcaOS replaces the 16-bit IBM OS/2 USB driver with a new 32-bit driver capable of supporting USB 2.0 and USB 3.0 controllers.
 Audio support utilizes the Uniaud generic audio driver, now maintained by Arca Noae. Uniaud is based on the ALSA framework from the Linux kernel. In addition, a selection of device-specific drivers are included with ArcaOS. A new audio driver is planned for future releases of ArcaOS, based on FreeBSD audio drivers.
 Video support is provided by Panorama generic unaccelerated VESA driver, or SNAP accelerated video driver. Features such as acceleration and multi-head are supported for a limited number of graphics chipsets. Support for these features in additional chipsets, such as the Intel HD series, is planned. 
 Storage drivers are available for IDE, AHCI, NVMe and a number of SCSI adapters.
 Support for printers is provided by the eCups project, which is based on the open-source Common Unix Printing System.

Software

In addition to the software bundled with OS/2 Warp 4, ArcaOS includes some additional software, such as:

 Mozilla Firefox, Thunderbird and SeaMonkey 
 Apache OpenOffice
 Lucide, an open source document viewer
 XWorkplace, a set of open source enhancements to the Workplace Shell
 4OS2
 OpenJDK 6
 Qt 4 and 5
 Samba 4
 Heimdal Kerberos
 VirtualBox

Cross-platform compatibility

ArcaOS includes a number of software components which allow it to directly run software developed for other operating systems, and to simplify the process of porting software to ArcaOS:

 ArcaOS includes OS/2's MVDM and WIN-OS/2, allowing ArcaOS to run 16-bit MS-DOS and Windows 3.1 applications natively. ArcaOS features some improvements to these subsystems which are not found in OS/2, such as the ability to access volumes greater than 2GB from Windows and DOS, as well as ongoing work which will allow 16-bit Windows and DOS software to run on UEFI systems which do not have a traditional BIOS.
 ArcaOS includes Odin, based on Wine, which provides a subset of the Win32 API. Odin can be used to run certain Win32 applications directly, while other applications, such as the OS/2 port of OpenJDK, use the Odin API to simplify porting Windows software to OS/2.
 ArcaOS provides a Unix compatibility layer named kLIBC which facilitates the porting of open source Linux applications to ArcaOS. A variety of Linux tools ship with ArcaOS such as the Bash shell and the GNU coreutils, while others are available through the ArcaOS package manager, such as GCC.
 A port of OpenJDK is included, which allows ArcaOS to run Java applications which do not have platform-specific dependencies.

Filesystems
ArcaOS's default filesystem is JFS, although HPFS is also supported for backwards compatibility. ArcaOS may be installed to and booted from either filesystem.

FAT12, FAT16, and FAT32 are also supported using either the OS/2 kernel's own FAT driver, or a new Arca Noae-developed FAT32 IFS driver, included in ArcaOS since version 5.0.3. ArcaOS includes support for optical disc filesystems such as ISO 9660 and UDF.

ArcaOS supports serving and accessing CIFS/SMB shares using the open source Samba project, and provides a graphical utility named ArcaMapper to manage configuration.

NetDrive for OS/2 provides access to a variety of additional filesystems such as NTFS and NFS via its own IFS driver. The ArcaOS distribution includes a limited license version of NetDrive but the fully licensed version is capable of mounting a number of other local, native, and foreign file systems.

Installation and updates

ArcaOS features a new graphical installer which replaces the IBM installer used in OS/2 Warp. Unlike OS/2, the ArcaOS installation process does not require a boot floppy, and instead the installer can be booted directly from optical media, or from a USB flash drive. The installer also provides an update facility, which allows ArcaOS to be updated to the latest release without reinstalling the entire operating system.

Installation and updates of individual software packages is provided through the Arca Noae Package Manager (ANPM), which consists of a native OS/2 graphical frontend on top of RPM and YUM. Software is provided through a mixture of freely available, and subscription only RPM repositories.

Hardware requirements
The minimum hardware requirements for ArcaOS 5.0 is as follows:

History

Blue Lion
ArcaOS was formally announced on October 23, 2015, at the Warpstock 2015 event (an OS/2 user group event) under the code name "Blue Lion" by Arca Noae's Managing Member, Lewis Rosenthal.

Some of the planned features for Blue Lion announced at the time were:

 new Symmetric multiprocessing kernel
 new pre-boot menu
 new OS installer with support for installation from USB flash drive and across a network
 device drivers already produced by Arca Noae as part of their Drivers & Software Subscription
 the latest Workplace Shell enhancements
 updated CUPS print subsystem
 updated PostScript printer driver pack
 localization in several languages besides English

At the time of the announcement, the initial release was projected for late third quarter of 2016, but Arca Noae also stated that no actual release date had been set.

ArcaOS 5.0

The name "ArcaOS" was first published in a TechRepublic article on May 26, 2016, while the arcaos.com domain was registered December 20, 2015. In the same TechRepublic article, Lewis Rosenthal was quoted as saying that the first release of ArcaOS would be version 5.0, as it follows onto the last release of OS/2 Warp from IBM, which was 4.52 (also known as Merlin Convenience Pack 2, or MCP2).

ArcaOS 5.0 was released May 15, 2017. There were two editions released: a commercial edition, intended for enterprise use (including 12 months of upgraded/prioritized technical support), and a personal edition, targeted at non-business users (including six months of standard technical support) at a reduced price. Pricing was listed as $229 per license for the commercial edition, and $129 per license for the personal edition, with $99 promotional price in effect for the first 90 days following release.

ArcaOS 5.0 was followed by a number of maintenance releases between 2017 and 2021. In addition to bug fixes and driver updates, the maintenance releases added some significant features such as USB 3.0 support, the ability to install from a USB drive, and the update facility. During Warpstock 2021, Arca Noae announced that 5.0.7 would be the final maintenance release of 5.0, and that it would be followed by the 5.1 release.

ArcaOS 5.1

Prior to the release of ArcaOS 5.0, ArcaOS 5.1 was originally planned for release in 2017 with a focus on supporting other languages including French, Spanish, Italian, German, and Dutch. Following the release of ArcaOS 5.0, Arca Noae began discussing a 5.1 release in their roadmaps, along with proposed new features. During Warpstock 2020, Arca Noae announced that 5.1 is expected to be released during 2021. Some features planned for inclusion into 5.1 include:

 Support for booting on UEFI-only systems without a Compatibility Support Module (CSM). This involves providing emulation of specific BIOS functionality which the operating system depends on (particularly interrupts INT 10H and INT 13H). As of 2020, Arca Noae have demonstrated the installation of ArcaOS onto a UEFI system, and booting with the CSM disabled.
 Support for disks using GUID partition tables (GPT) is under development, which will allow disks larger than 2TB to be supported.
 Localized releases of ArcaOS, known as National Language Versions (NLV). Planned languages include German, Spanish, French, Italian, Simplified and Traditional Chinese, Japanese, Korean and Dutch. This involves augmenting the localization in OS/2 Warp 4 with translations for the new software added in ArcaOS, such as the installer and XWorkplace.
 An upgrade facility to allow in-place migration of ArcaOS 5.0 to 5.1 without reinstalling the entire operating system.
 A migration facility to allow in-place migration of OS/2 Warp 4 and eComStation systems to ArcaOS without removing the existing operating system installation first. This feature is unlikely to be included in the initial 5.1 release.
 Desktop search functionality based on the open-source Recoll project.
 Replacing the monolithic IBM Selective Install utility with a number of Arca Noae-developed utilities.
 New device drivers, particularly support for NVMe drives.

The OS/2 software vendor Bitwise Works is porting QtWebEngine (based on Chromium) to OS/2 and ArcaOS in order to support a new browser to replace Firefox. This has been prompted by the increasing complexity of the Firefox codebase, and use of the Rust programming language in newer versions of Firefox - whose compiler is unlikely to ever be supported on the OS/2 platform. During Warpstock 2020, a demo was carried out which showed the Qt WebEngine Demo Browser running on ArcaOS and successfully loading modern web pages.

Originally the Falkon browser had been considered for porting to the OS/2 platform, but it has since been discounted due to Falkon's dependency on libraries from the KDE Frameworks. As a result, the Otter Browser is being considered instead. The new web browser will be added to the ArcaOS 5.1 release series once it is complete.

Release history

References

External links 

 Arca Noae – Website of the developer of ArcaOS

OS/2
X86 operating systems
2017 software
Proprietary operating systems